This is a list of award-winning pubs in London.

Pub Design Awards (PDA)
The Pub Design Awards are hosted by CAMRA and English Heritage.

2001 Conversion Award: Porterhouse, Maiden Lane
1999 Conversion Award: Half Moon, Mile End Road (Joint Winner with Billiard Hall, West Bromwich)

CAMRA National Pub of the Year

National Pub of the Year Award
The Harp in Charing Cross won in 2010 as announced in February 2011.

Greater London regional winners

 2022: The Hop Inn, Hornchurch
 2021: The Hop Inn, Hornchurch
 2020: Competition cancelled due to COVID-19 pandemic
 2019: The Hope, Carshalton
 2018: Little Green Dragon, Winchmore Hill
 2017: The Hope, Carshalton
 2016: The Hope, Carshalton – The first time a pub has concurrently held "CAMRA Greater London Pub of the Year" and "SPBW London Pub of the Year" awards
 2015: One Inn The Wood, Petts Wood, Orpington
 2014: The Door Hinge, Welling (with equal votes, but declared runner-up, The Hope, Carshalton)
 2013: The Hope, Carshalton – The first time the CAMRA Greater London Pub of the Year title has been retained by a pub
 2012: The Hope, Carshalton
 2011: Southampton Arms, Kentish Town
 2010: The Harp, Charing Cross
 2009: The Bricklayer's Arms, Putney
 2008: The Trafalgar, Merton
 2007: The Bricklayer's Arms, Putney

SPBW London Pub of the Year

The Society for the Preservation of Beers from the Wood (SPBW) usually chooses a "London Pub of the Year" every year.

SPBW previous winners

2022: Competition not held
2021: Competition cancelled due to COVID-19 pandemic
2020: Competition cancelled due to COVID-19 pandemic
SPBW decided to make 2 awards for 2019 London Pub of the Year to bring the competition in line in future with the calendar year in which judging takes place.
2019: (2nd award): Ye Olde Mitre, Holborn
2019: The River Ale House, 131 Woolwich Road, East Greenwich, Greenwich
 2018: The Broken Drum, 308 Westwood Lane, Blackfen, Sidcup
2017: Chesham Arms, Homerton
2016: The Hope, Carshalton
2015: Blythe Hill Tavern, Forest Hill
2014: The Eleanor Arms, Bow
2013: Ye Olde Mitre, Holborn
2012: The Royal Oak, Southwark
2011: The Dog & Bell, Deptford
2010: The Pembury Tavern Hackney
2009: The Dog & Bell, Deptford
2008: The Harp, Charing Cross
2007: The Pembury Tavern, Hackney
2006: The Royal Oak, Southwark
2005: The Dog & Bell, Deptford
2004: The Royal Oak, Southwark
2003: The Wenlock Arms, Hoxton

Evening Standard Pub of the Year

The "Evening Standard Pub of the Year" title was awarded annually, from 1967 to 2006, to a pub selected from a shortlist by readers of the Evening Standard, London's main evening newspaper. Each winner of the award is permitted to display a plaque on the wall outside. The award was discontinued in 2006 after 40 years.

Evening Standard previous winners
 2006: The Clarence, Balham
 2005: The Morgan Arms, Mile End
 2004: The Earl Spencer, Southfields
 2003: Draper's Arms, Islington
 2002: The Bedford, Balham
 2001: The Settle Inn, Battersea
 2000: The Cow Saloon Bar, Paddington
 1999: The Churchill Arms, Kensington
 1998: The Duke of Cambridge, Battersea
 1997: The White Swan, Twickenham
 1996: The Trafalgar Tavern, Greenwich
 1994/1995: The George Inn, Southwark
 1993: The Phoenix & Firkin, Southwark
 1992: The Star Tavern, Westminster
 1991: The Ship, Wandsworth
 1990: The White Horse, Parsons Green
 1989: The Scarsdale Tavern, Kensington and Chelsea
 1988: The Anglesea Arms, South Kensington
 1987: No Award
 1986: The Princess Louise, Holborn
 1985: The Clifton, Clifton Hill, St John's Wood
 1984: The Albert, Westminster
 1983: The Castle, Surbiton
 1982: The Hand in Hand, Wimbledon
 1981: The Railway Bell, Norwood
 1980: The Rose of York, Richmond
 1979: The Royal Oak, New Malden
 1978: The Old Ship, Hammersmith
 1977: The Angel, Bermondsey, SE16
 1976: The Orange Tree, Richmond
 1975: The Greyhound, Kensington and Chelsea
 1974: The Flask, Highgate
 1973: The Pied Bull, Streatham
 1972: The Victoria, Bermondsey SE1
 1971: The Duke of Cumberland, Parsons Green
 1970: The Rose and Crown, Wimbledon
 1967: The Red Lion, Brentford

See also
 List of bars
 List of public house topics

References

External links
SPBW

 
Pubs
Award-winning pubs in London
London, award winning
Evening Standard Awards